Cranleigh School is a public school (English fee-charging boarding and day school) in the village of Cranleigh, Surrey.

History
 
It was opened on 29 September 1865 as a boys' school 'to provide a sound and plain education, on the principles of the Church of England, and on the public school system, for the sons of farmers and others engaged in commercial pursuits'. It grew rapidly and by the 1880s had more than 300 pupils although it declined over the next 30 years and in 1910 numbers dropped to 150.

Cranleigh started to admit girls in the early 1970s and became fully co-educational in 1999. The current headmaster is Martin Reader with former East Housemaster, Simon Bird, as the Deputy Head.

The Good Schools Guide at one time described the school as a "Hugely popular school with loads on offer, improving academia and mega street cred. Ideal for the sporty, energetic, sociable, independent and lovely child."

The school's Trevor Abbott Sports Centre was opened by Sir Richard Branson and the West House was opened by Baroness Greenfield. New building projects have included the extension onto Cubitt House as well as an environmentally friendly Woodland Workshop and a new £10 million Academic Centre named the Emms Centre. Named after David Emms, this was opened by Lord Patten of Barnes in 2009. The building includes new facilities for Science and Modern Languages as well as a lecture theatre. A £2 million renovation of the chapel in 2009 included the installation of a £500,000 Mander organ.

In a 2015 survey, it was rated as the third best sporting school in the UK. Its teams won the Rosslyn Park National Sevens Tournament consecutively, in both 2016 and 2017.

Cranleigh School also has a sister school based in Abu Dhabi which opened in September 2014.

Notable Old Cranleighans

 Anthony Ainley (actor)
 Tony Anholt (actor)
 Sammy Arnold (Ireland Rugby Player)
 Olivia Attwood (TV personality)
 Stacy Aumonier (writer)
 Thomas Alexander Barns (explorer, big game hunter, author)
 Sir Nicholas Blake (High Court judge)
 Hugh Blaker (artist, collector, connoisseur, dealer in Old Masters, museum curator, writer on art)
 Derek Bourgeois (composer)
 Luke Braid (Rugby Player, Junior All Black and IRB Young Player of the Year 2008)
 Sir Gordon Brunton (industrialist)
 David Buggé (cricketer and banker)
 Sir David Calcutt (lawyer)
 Harry Calder (cricketer)
 Rob Curling (television presenter and journalist)
 Michael Cochrane (actor)
 Peter Conder (ornithologist and conservationist)
 Peter Henry Emerson (photographer)
 Afshin Feiz (fashion designer)
 Eric Fellner (film producer)
 David Garnett (writer)
 Paul Goodman (politician)
 Peter Gordon (radio presenter)
 Bernard Gutteridge (poet)
 G. H. Hardy (mathematician)
 Nick Harper (Global News TV reporter)
 Victor Heerman (director, writer)
 Christopher Herrick (musician)
 Adam Holloway (MP, politician, journalist, soldier)
 Will Howard (cricketer)
 Frederick George Jackson (explorer)
 Lieutenant General James Gordon Legge (soldier) 
 Patrick Marber (actor, director, screenwriter)
 John Mark (athlete, lighter of the Olympic Cauldron in 1948)
 George May, 1st Baron May (civil servant)
 Stuart Meaker (England cricketer)
 Laurence Naismith (actor)
 Julia Ormond (actress)
 Nitin Passi (fashion retailer)
 Jolyon Palmer (Formula One driver)
 Ollie Pope (England cricketer)
 Major-General Arnold Reading (Royal Marines general and first-class cricketer)
 Major General Michael Reynolds CB
 Andrew Roberts, Baron Roberts of Belgravia (historian, broadcaster)
 Alan Rusbridger (former Guardian editor)
 Flight Lieutenant Zane Sennett (Red Arrows pilot)
 Sam Smith (professional rugby union footballer, Harlequins and England U20) 
 Sewell Stokes (novelist and playwright)
 E W Swanton (cricket and rugby correspondent, commentator and author)
 Christopher Trace, the first presenter of the BBC's long-running Blue Peter children's programme
 Arthur Upfield (soldier, writer)
 James William Webb-Jones (Choral conductor; Headmaster of St George's School, Windsor Castle; Headmaster of Wells Cathedral School)
 David Westcott (GB hockey captain)
 Isabelle Petter (Great Britain hockey player and Olympic bronze medalist)

Notable masters
 Steve Batchelor (Great Britain hockey player and Olympic gold medallist)
 Neil Bennett (England rugby player)
 Revd. William Booth (clergyman)
 Luis Cernuda (Spanish poet)
 Andrew Corran (cricketer)
 David Emms (rugby player, headmaster)
 Dan Fox (England and GB hockey player)
 Roger Knight (cricketer)
 Charles W L Parker (England cricketer, Gloucestershire cricketer)
 Sir Michael Redgrave (actor)
 Guy Waller (cricketer; headmaster between 1997 and 2014)
 Hilary Davan Wetton (Conductor)
 Mike Worsley (England rugby player)

Old Cranleighans

Former pupils of the school may join the Old Cranleighan Society. About 6,500 past pupils are currently members. The Old Cranleighan Sports Club in Thames Ditton in Surrey is owned by the Society.

Southern Railway Schools Class
The thirty seventh steam locomotive (Engine 936) in the Southern Railway's Class V, built in 1934 was named "Cranleigh" after the school. This class of locomotive was known as the Schools Class because all 40 of the class were named after English public schools.

References

External links

 
 OC Society website
 OC Cricket Club website
 OC Hockey Club website
 OC Rugby Football Club website

Member schools of the Headmasters' and Headmistresses' Conference
 
Private schools in Surrey
Educational institutions established in 1865
Boarding schools in Surrey
1865 establishments in England
Cranleigh